Ernesto Reyes Milian (born 10 September 1992) is a Cuban badminton player. He competed at the 2015 Pan American Games. Reyes was the bronze medalists at the 2014 Central American and Caribbean Games in the men's doubles and team event. He won the Giraldilla International tournament in the men's doubles event partnered with Ronald Toledo in 2012, and with Leodannis Martínez in 2016. He competed at the 2018 Central American and Caribbean Games in Barranquilla, Colombia, and helped the team win the silver medal.

Achievements

Central American and Caribbean Games 
Men's doubles

BWF International Challenge/Series 
Men's doubles

  BWF International Challenge tournament
  BWF International Series tournament
  BWF Future Series tournament

References

External links 
 

1992 births
Living people
Cuban male badminton players
Pan American Games competitors for Cuba
Badminton players at the 2015 Pan American Games
Central American and Caribbean Games silver medalists for Cuba
Central American and Caribbean Games bronze medalists for Cuba
Competitors at the 2014 Central American and Caribbean Games
Competitors at the 2018 Central American and Caribbean Games
Central American and Caribbean Games medalists in badminton
20th-century Cuban people
21st-century Cuban people